Formica creightoni is a species of ant in the genus Formica ("wood ants, mound ants, & field ants"), in the family Formicidae ("ants").

References

Further reading
 Ross H. Arnett. (2000). American Insects: A Handbook of the Insects of America North of Mexico. CRC Press.

creightoni
Insects described in 1968